The men's 3000 metre steeplechase at the 2016 European Athletics Championships took place at the Olympic Stadium on 6 and 8 July.

Records

Schedule

Results

Round 1

First 5 in each heat (Q) and 5 best performers (q) advance to the Final.

Final

References

External links
 amsterdam2016.org, official championship site.

Steeplechase 3000 M
Steeplechase at the European Athletics Championships